Avimator is a basic BVH (Biovision Hierarchy) editor, originally written for use with Second Life, as a simple inexpensive alternative to commercial 3D rendering and animation software, such as Poser and Maya. It is open source software, and is based on the FLTK toolkit.

Avimator is available for Microsoft Windows, Macintosh and Linux versions. It is not currently under active development, but has been largely superseded by a Qt port, QAvimator. QAvimator is free software released under the GNU GPL v2.

References

External links
https://web.archive.org/web/20080214072812/http://www.avimator.com/ 
https://qavimator.bitbucket.io/

Second Life
Free 3D graphics software
Software that uses FLTK